Bruce Martin Mathison (born April 25, 1959) is a former American football quarterback who played in the NFL for the San Diego Chargers (two stints), Buffalo Bills, and as a replacement player for the Seattle Seahawks during the 1987 strike season. He played college football at the University of Nebraska.

References

 

1959 births
Living people
American football quarterbacks
San Diego Chargers players
Buffalo Bills players
Seattle Seahawks players
Nebraska Cornhuskers football players
Sportspeople from Superior, Wisconsin
Players of American football from Wisconsin
National Football League replacement players